Orthocephalus is a genus of plant bugs in the family Miridae. There are more than 20 described species in Orthocephalus.

Species
These 23 species belong to the genus Orthocephalus:

 Orthocephalus arnoldii (V.Putshkov, 1961)
 Orthocephalus bivittatus Fieber, 1864
 Orthocephalus brevis (Panzer, 1798)
 Orthocephalus championi Saunders, 1894
 Orthocephalus coriaceus (Fabricius, 1777)
 Orthocephalus fulvipes Reuter, 1904
 Orthocephalus funestus Jakovlev, 1881
 Orthocephalus medvedevi Kiritshenko, 1951
 Orthocephalus melas Seidenstucker, 1962
 Orthocephalus minimus Drapolyuk & Kerzhner, 2000
 Orthocephalus modarresi Linnavuori, 1997
 Orthocephalus proserpinae (Mulsant & Rey, 1852)
 Orthocephalus putshkovi Namyatova & Konstantinov, 2009
 Orthocephalus rhyparopus Fieber, 1864
 Orthocephalus saltator (Hahn, 1835)
 Orthocephalus scorzonerae Drapolyuk & Kerzhner, 2000
 Orthocephalus sefrensis Reuter, 1895
 Orthocephalus solidus (Seidenstucker, 1971)
 Orthocephalus styx Reuter, 1908
 Orthocephalus tibialis (Reuter, 1894)
 Orthocephalus tristis (Reuter, 1894)
 Orthocephalus turkmenicus Namyatova & Konstantinov, 2009
 Orthocephalus vittipennis (Herrich-Schaeffer, 1835)

References

Further reading

External links

 

Miridae genera
Articles created by Qbugbot
Orthotylinae